HC Dukla Prague is a handball club from Prague, Czech Republic, that plays in the Chance Extraliga.

History 
Originally it was a part of a Czechoslovak army sports club supporting several different sports teams, including football, which was founded in 1948 as ATK Praha and later renamed Dukla Prague. The handball team of Dukla Praha was the most successful Czechoslovak handball team. They won the Czechoslovak handball league 28 times, and the Czech handball championship three times after the dissolution of Czechoslovakia. In 1956, 1963 and 1984 they won the European Champions' Cup (now EHF Champions League) and in 1967 and 1968 they finished in the finals. In 1982 they reached the final of the EHF Cup Winners' Cup. In 1963 they were awarded the team trophy of the Czechoslovak Sportsperson of the Year.

Crest, colours, supporters

Kits

Team

Current squad 

Squad for the 2022–23 season

Technical staff
 Head Coach:  Michal Tonar

Transfers

Transfers for the 2022–23 season

Joining 
  Matúš Moravčík (LP) from  HáO TJ Slovan Modra
  Jiří Dokoupil (LP) from  HC Zubří
  Tomáš Turek (LP) from  TJ JM Chodov Praha
  Adam Antolík (LB) from  ŠK Zemplín Trebišov

Leaving 
  Adam Zeman (LP) (retires)
  Zdeněk Ježek (LP) to  O2xyworld HBC Jičín
  Jan Blecha (LW) to  EHV Aue
  Martin Maleček (RW) to  TJ JM Chodov Praha

Previous squads

Accomplishments 

EHF Champions League:
 : 1957, 1963, 1984,
 : 1967, 1968,
 : 1962, 1966, 1980, 1985,

EHF Cup:
 : 1990

Czech Handball Extraliga:
 : 1994, 2011, 2017,
 : 1996, 2003, 2007, 2012, 2016,
 : 1997, 1999, 2005, 2008, 2009, 2010, 2013, 2018,

Czechoslovakia Handball League:
 : 1950, 1953, 1954, 1955, 1956, 1958, 1959, 1961, 1962, 1963, 1964, 1965, 1966, 1967, 1970, 1977, 1979, 1980, 1982, 1983, 1984, 1985, 1986, 1987, 1988, 1990, 1991, 1992,
 : 1960, 1968, 1969, 1978, 1981, 
 : 1971, 1975, 1989,

European record

European Cup and Champions League

EHF ranking

Former club members

Notable former players

  Michal Barda (1979–1987)
  Tomáš Bartek (1977–1988)
  Petr Baumruk (1981–1990)
  Roman Bečvář (1986–1992)
  Ladislav Beneš (1962–1979)
  Milan Berka (1998–2000)
  Bohumil Cepák (1970–1972)
  Bedřich Ciner (1960–1962)
  Václav Duda (1959–1975)
  Václav Eret (1950–1951)
  Jan Filip (1991–1997, 1998–1999)
  Miroslav Frank (1981–1983)
  Vladimír Haber (1969–1971)
  Rudolf Havlík (1956–1973)
  František Heřman (1958–1960)
  Radek Horák (2007–2012)
  Petr Hrubý (1996–2004)
  Jiří Hynek (2002–2005)
  Petr Házl (1991–1995)
  Vladimír Jarý (1968–1970)
  Filip Jícha (2000–2003)
  Karel Jindřichovský (1986–1994)
  Jiří Kavan (1966–1979)
  Matěj Klíma (2016–2021)
  Jaroslav Konečný (1964–1966)
  Bedřich König (1951–1976)
  Jiří Kotrč (1978–1990, 1994–1996)
  Milan Kotrč (2007–2017)
  Martin Kovář (1997–1999)
  Jindřich Krepindl (1968–1970)
  Daniel Kubeš (1996–2001)
  Jan Landa (2005–2011)
  Martin Lehocký (2006–2013)
  Jiří Liška (1971–1984)
  Vojtěch Mareš (1959–1971)
  Pavel Mikeš (1970–1972)
  Dieudonné Mubenzem (2014–2018)
  Radek Musil (1995–2001)
  Karel Nocar (1998–1999, 2002–2003)
  Jan Novák (1981–1990)
  Zdeněk Pešl (1951–1953)
  Bohumír Prokop (1987–1992, 1996–1997)
  Jaroslav Provazník (1957–1958)
  Jaroslav Rážek (1961–1971)
  Ivan Satrapa (1965–1980)
  Martin Šetlík (1992–1994)
  Zdeněk Škára (1973–1974)
  Jaroslav Škarvan (1964–1978)
  Miloš Slabý (1989–2000)
  Libor Sovadina (1986–1990)
  Oldřich Spáčil (1952–1962)
  Jan Stehlík (2005–2009)
  František Štika (1976–1984)
  Jan Štochl (2002–2005)
  Petr Štochl (2000–2001)
  Václav Straka (2007–2008)
  Jakub Sviták (2010–)
  Michal Tonar (1988–1990)
  Zdeněk Vaněk (1987–1992)
  Jan Větrovec (2003–2006)
  Jiří Vícha (1950–1985)
  Jiří Vítek (1996–1999)
  Václav Vraný (2004–2007)
  Milan Brestovanský (1979–1981)
  Peter Dávid (1986–1988)
  Milan Folta (1987–1988)
  Anton Frolo (1957–1959)
  Rudolf Horváth (1966–1968)
  Peter Kakaščík (1990–1991)
  Maroš Kolpak (1993–1995)
  Peter Mesiarik (1982–1984)
  Richard Štochl (2001)

Former coaches

References

External links
 
 

Prague, HC Dukla
Czech handball clubs
Handball clubs established in 1948
1948 establishments in Czechoslovakia
Handball
 Dukla HC